The Comptroller of Puerto Rico is a constitutionally-created office charged with carrying out post-audits of the use of public funds in Puerto Rico. The Comptroller is appointed by the Governor of Puerto Rico and requires the advice and consent of both the Senate of Puerto Rico as well as the Puerto Rico House of Representatives for a term of office of ten years and until a successor is nominated, confirmed and qualified. Former Comptroller Manuel Díaz Saldaña's was the longest-serving comptroller, having served almost 13 years, until his successor, Yesmín Valdivieso, was appointed by Governor Luis Fortuño, confirmed and sworn in.

Comptrollers
The following people have served as comptrollers:
 style="margin: 0 auto"
! scope=col| #
! scope=col| Portrait
! scope=col| Name
! scope=col| Took office
! scope=col| Left office
! scope=col| Appointer
|-
! scope=row| 1
|
| Rafael de J. Cordero Orta
| 1952
| 1961
| Luis Muñoz Marín
|-
! scope=row| 2
|
| Justo Nieves Torres
| 1961
| 1971
| Luis Muñoz Marín
|-
! scope=row| 3
| 
| Basilio Santiago Romero
| 1971
| 1977
| Luis A. Ferré
|-
! scope=row| 4
| 
| Ramón Rivera Marrero
| 1978
| 1986
| Carlos Romero Barceló
|-
! scope=row| 5
|
| Luis M. Malpica
| 1986
| 1987
| Rafael Hernández Colón
|-
! scope=row| 6
|
| Ileana Colón Carlo
| 1987
| 1997
| Rafael Hernández Colón
|-
! scope=row| 7
|
| Manuel Díaz Saldaña
| 1997
| 2010
| Pedro Rosselló
|-
! scope=row| 8
|
| Yesmín M. Valdivieso
| 2010
| present
| Luis Fortuño
|-

The term of Yesmín M. Valdivieso was supposed to end in 2020 and governor Wanda Vázquez Garced unsuccessfully nominated Osvaldo Soto García for the position. In 2021 governor Pedro Pierluisi nominated Manuel Torres Nieves to the post but he has yet to be confirmed to the post by the Senate.

References

Legislative branch of the government of Puerto Rico